Cidra may refer to:

Cidra, Puerto Rico, a municipality
Cidra, Añasco, Puerto Rico, a barrio
Cidra barrio-pueblo, a barrio